Awakening is the second album by indietronica group Iris, released in 2003. Awakening was the first album to feature Andrew Sega, who added guitars and pushed the band's sound into a more experimental electronic direction.

Background
After several shows that followed after Disconnect, Reagan Jones and Matthew Morris started having arguments about their musical direction. Morris was focused on his personal life, and he wasn't interested in going back into the studio for the second album. He met Andrew Sega through the original singer of CTRL Joel Willard in 2001, and told him that Jones was looking for someone new to work with. Sega and Jones started working on some test tracks, the first of which would later become "Unknown". They felt that the chemistry between the two worked out so well that they started working on the new record that would become Awakening.

Versions
In total there are 5 versions of this album.

Track listing US

Track listing Europe
All European versions have their album artwork tinted magenta.

Personnel
 Reagan Jones - vocals, songwriting, keyboards
 Andrew Sega - keyboards, guitars, programming, production

Comments
1, 2 - do not appear on Polish version.

References

External links
 [ Allmusic review]

2003 albums
Iris (American band) albums